Camp Jened was a summer camp for disabled people in the state of New York that became a springboard for the disability rights movement and independent living movement in the United States. Many campers and counselors (also known as "Jenedians") became disability rights activists, such as Judith Heumann, James LeBrecht, and Bobbi Linn.

History 
In 1951, Camp Jened was established at the foot of Hunter Mountain in the Catskill Mountains as a camp for disabled children, teenagers, and adults. The camp was meant to provide a nurturing community environment for people with a range of disabilities, such as polio and cerebral palsy. Camp sessions were typically four weeks or eight weeks. In the 1950s, the camp followed a relatively traditional summer camp structure. Alan Winters served as an early director of the camp. The camp was partially funded and supported by the Jened Foundation, a parent-led foundation that organized fundraisers. Counselors were typically college students who had been recruited for summer jobs.

In the 1960s and 1970s, the camp became heavily influenced by the 1960s counterculture and hippie values. In the mid-1960s, Jack Birnbaum, a social worker, came to Camp Jened. He had previously worked at another camp for disabled youth in Oakhurst, New Jersey. He asked Larry Allison, a counselor at the camp in Oakhurst, to come with him and serve as unit head. Birnbaum and Allison were interested in developing a camp culture that was more unstructured than their previous camp experiences. Later, Allison became the program director. In this role, he was "an affable longhair" with a "dry fuck-you sense of humor".

Camp Jened was a notably social environment, and some campers saw it as Utopian. As described by former camper Denise Jacobson, "It was so funky! But it was utopia when we were there. There was no outside world." There were about 120 campers with minimal adult supervision. Campers formed bonds removed from the stigma, shame, and isolation they often encountered back home. Some campers experimented with marijuana and formed romantic relationships with one another. Counselors slept in the same bunks as the campers, and music was often being played. While the majority of the campers were from New York, some campers came from Canada and other parts of the United States.

Despite its profound social impact, the camp often experienced financial issues. Allison explained in an interview that "money was a constant struggle," and counselors were paid $250 for the summer. In 1977, the camp closed due to financial difficulty. In 1980, Camp Jened reopened in Rock Hill, New York, and it became a part of the Cerebral Palsy Associations of New York State. However, the camp closed again in 2009.

Influence on activism 
Camp Jened provided a fertile environment for political and social discussions. As explained by Judith Heumann, a former counselor at the camp: "At Camp Jened we were able to envision a world that didn’t have to be set up in a way that excluded us. We started to have a common vision and were beginning to talk about things like, ‘Why are buses not accessible?'" The former camper, James LeBrecht, explained: "I had this sense that the world was unfair. As a young teenager I realized, ‘Wow, we can actually fight back.'" The role of the family was also discussed among Jenedians, including the disabled person's right to privacy (rather than constant family intervention) and the impact of sexism in how parents treated their disabled children.

Furthermore, non-disabled staff came to deeply consider the struggles of disabled individuals. As Larry Allison reflected: "We realized the problem did not exist with disabled people. The problem existed with people that didn’t have disabilities. It was our problem." Meanwhile, Lionel Je’ Woodyard, an African-American counselor reflected that, "Whatever obstacles there were in my way for being a Black man, the same thing was held true for individuals in wheelchairs."

These experiences helped inspire Jenedians to become politically active. In 1970, Heumann sued the Board of Education on charges of discrimination after she was denied a teacher's license. She won the case, becoming the first person in a wheelchair to teach in New York City. That same year, Disabled in Action was formed by a group that included Heumann, Bobbi Linn, and other Jenedians. The organization advocated for the civil rights and security for disabled people. On the formation of Disabled in Action, Bobbi Linn reflected: "I think of Camp Jened as the training ground where people learned that they had the same rights as everybody else and a lot of the original people were people from Jened." In the early 1970s, Disabled in Action organized protests, such as the 1972 Manhattan traffic blockade to protest Richard Nixon's veto of the Rehabilitation Act of 1972. The act would have provided supplies for dialysis machines and established centers for people living with hearing loss, visual impairment, and spinal cord injuries.

By the mid-1970s, a group of Jenedians joined the Center for Independent Living in Berkeley, California. The center, which had been formed by disabled student activists at University of California, Berkeley, aimed to support the independence, dignity, and self-determination of disabled people. The center was located near the UC Berkeley campus, and it provided peer-based services to assist with housing and job training. The concept of independent living became a cornerstone of the disability rights movement.

In 1977, Jenedians participated in the 504 Sit-in in San Francisco, which involved a sit-in protest at the local Department of Health, Education, and Welfare (HEW) office that extended for nearly a month. Many organizations participated in the sit-in. The Black Panthers provided meals, and the Salvation Army provided mattresses. Other groups that joined the sit-in included the United Farm Workers, Glide Memorial Church, the Gay Men’s Butterfly Brigade, and Delancey Street Foundation.

For decades, Jenedians participated in activism and advocacy that led to the passing of the Americans with Disabilities Act of 1990, among other achievements. Judith Heumann became the first Director for the Department on Disability Services, and she served as an advisor on disability rights for the United States Department of State and the World Bank. Bobbi Linn became the first executive director of the Bronx Independent Living Services (BILS) and, in 2019, she was inducted into the New York State Disability Rights Hall of Fame. James LeBrecht helped form the Disabled Student Union at the University of California, San Diego and co-directed a documentary on Camp Jened. The former camp director, Larry Allison, served as Deputy Director at the New York City Mayor's Office for People with Disabilities (1973–1991), worked to improve polling place accessibility, and taught special education in Brooklyn.

Portrayal in publications 
In 2004, Camp Jened was covered in New York Activists and Leaders in the Disability Rights and Independent Living Movement, published by the Regents of the University of California. The three-part publication provided an oral history account of the disability rights movement in New York, as part of the Disability Rights and Independent Living Movement Oral History Project. Interview subjects who discussed Camp Jened were Larry Allison, interviewed by Denise Sherer Jacobson in 2001, and Bobbi Linn, interviewed by Sharon Bonney, in 2001.

Portrayal in popular culture 
In March 2020, Camp Jened was profiled in the documentary Crip Camp, directed by James LeBrecht, a former Jened camper, and Nicole Newnham. The film features former camp members including Judith Heumann, as well as footage that LeBrecht shot as a 15-year old camper in 1971. The documentary film became critically acclaimed and went on to win several accolades, including the Audience Award at the 2020 Sundance Film Festival and the Zeno Mountain Award at the 2020 Miami Film Festival.

References 

Greene County, New York
Jened
Disability organizations based in the United States
1951 establishments in New York (state)
2009 disestablishments in New York (state)